Pritam Chakraborty (Born 14 June 1971), also known mononymously as Pritam, is an Indian composer, instrumentalist, guitarist, and singer. After working as an ad jingles composer, he debuted as a co-composer in the 2001 Hindi film Tere Liye. As a solo composer, his composition of the title track of Dhoom helped him win the Zee Cine Award for Best Track of the Year. In a career spanning nearly two decades, he has composed music for more than 125 Bollywood Movies and he has been the recipient of numerous awards.

Early life
Pritam was born in a Bengali Brahmin family to Anuradha Chakraborty and Prabodh Chakraborty. He gained his early training in music from his father and learnt to play the guitar while he was still in school.

He went to St. James' School and has a bachelor's degree in geology from Presidency College. Pritam was associated with the non-partisan political platform Independents' Consolidation during his days at Presidency. In 1994, Pritam joined FTII, Pune where he took up Sound Recording and Engineering. 

Pritam formed a band with his presidency batchmates, called "Jotugriher Pakhi" for which, he used to play the guitar. They even have a cassette released to their credit at that time. Pritam joined a Bangla band, Chandrabindoo. Later Pritam started band Metro with James, Suhail, Soham and Eric during his film called Life in a... Metro.

Career

Pre-Bollywood
After completing his sound engineering course from FTII Pune, Chakraborty came to Mumbai in 1997. He started composing ad jingles where he met other budding artists such as Shantanu Moitra, Rajkumar Hirani, Sanjay Gadhvi and Jeet Gannguli. Pritam composed renowned jingles for brands like Santro, Emami, McDonald's, Head & Shoulders, Thums Up, Limca, Complan and composed title tracks for TV serials such as Astitva, Kkavyanjali, Ye Meri Life Hai, Remix, Kashmeer, Miilee, and Dil Kare.

Early Bollywood career (with Jeet Gannguli)
Pritam got his first break for Tere Liye (released December 2001). Though the music was well-received, the film missed the mark. In 2002, The Jeet-Pritam duo once again composed music for Yash Raj Films' Mere Yaar Ki Shaadi Hai. All the songs from that movie were chartbusters. Soon after, over some misunderstanding, Jeet decided to split and the partners and go their separate ways.

Solo career
Pritam's compositions were noted for their ability to blend Indian classical music with western styles. His compositions for Gadhvi's second movie Dhoom were a runaway hit. The title-track of Dhoom in two versions – Hindi (by Sunidhi Chauhan) and English (by Tata Young) – broke geographic barriers becoming popular in pubs in the UK, USA and the East Asia and won him a Zee Cine Award for Best Track of the Year. He received two nominations for Dhoom.

He followed this up with compositions for films like Ajab Prem Ki Ghazab Kahani, Race, Kismat Konnection, Jannat, Gangster and Dhoom 2. His compositions for Anurag Basu's Life in a... Metro garnered him very positive reviews. He formed a band called Metro with Suhail Kaul, Sohu pet name Chakraborty, Eric Pillai and Bangladeshi singer James for the movie.

He won his second Zee Cine Award for Best Track of the Year for the song "Mauja Hi Mauja" from Jab We Met by Imtiaz Ali. Jab We Met won him his first Apsara Award for Best Music Director. He composed for two more Imtiaz Ali films, Love Aaj Kal and Cocktail which were critically and commercially successful.

His Sufi songs for the 2010 movie Once Upon A Time in Mumbaai were immensely popular with the masses and songs like "Pee loon" and "Tum Jo Aaye" were declared chartbusters. He teamed up again with Mahesh Bhatt and Vishesh Films for music of Crook of which the song "Mere Bina" got instant recognition with public. His foot-tapping numbers for Rohit Shetty's Golmaal 3 were also equally successful. In 2011, he got to work for Salman Khan's Ready and Bodyguard. He recreated the famous 1971 song, "Dum Maro Dum" for Ramesh Sippy's 2011 movie of the same name. He then composed for the romance Mausam which had a strong influence of Punjabi. The songs were phenomenal hits in Northern India with "Rabba Main To Mar Gaya Oye" being a rage among people.

In 2012, he composed several successful songs for films like Players, Agent Vinod, Jannat 2 and Vidhu Vinod Chopra’s Ferrari Ki Sawaari, where he worked with Rajkumar Hirani. Later that year, he scored music for Barfi! which won him two Filmfare Awards. Barfi is considered to be one of the most critically acclaimed soundtrack album of his career. By 2013, his list included Race 2, Murder 3, Yeh Jawaani Hai Deewani, Dhoom 3 and Once Upon ay Time in Mumbai Dobaara which was his 100th movie as a Music Director in Bollywood. He started 2014 with compositions for Yaariyan, Shaadi Ke Side Effects & Holiday: A Soldier Is Never Off Duty. He then took a break in 2014.

He marked his return with three successful albums in 2015: Kabir Khan's Bajrangi Bhaijaan & Phantom and Rohit Shetty's Dilwale for which he was nominated for Filmfare awards. The Song, "Gerua" from Dilwale directly opened at the No. 1 position on the Radio Mirchi charts and became the first Bollywood song to cross 100 million views on YouTube in the shortest duration ever. It also ranked in the top slot in places like Malaysia, Oman, Sri Lanka and Bahrain. In 2016, he appeared as a guest composer and composed the song "Itni Si Baat Hai" for Azhar; the albumes other composers were Amaal Mallik and Dj Chetas. He also composed the whole soundtracks of Dishoom, Ae Dil Hai Mushkil and Dangal. In 2017, he composed the soundtracks of Jagga Jasoos, Raabta along with Sohrabuddin, Sourav Roy and JAM8, Tubelight and Jab Harry Met Sejal along with Diplo. In 2019, he composed songs for Kalank and will produce the music for Brahmastra. 83- The Film is lined up for 2020.

Musical style
Pritam has composed and covered some popular songs in a variety of genres including Rock (Life in a... Metro), Sufi (Once Upon A Time in Mumbaai) and even Ghazals (Barfi). His musical style is mainly characterized as a delicate fusion of Indian classical music with contemporary undertones.

Allegations of plagiarism 
Pritam has been alleged to have plagiarized numerous songs from the beginning of his film music career. Hits such as "Pehli Nazar Mein" was plagiarized from the Korean song "Sarang Hae Yo" by Kim Hyung Su (2005). His critically acclaimed soundtrack Ae Dil Hai Mushkil also faced allegations of plagiarism as the guitar riff of the song "Bulleya" was lifted from the Papa Roach song "Last Resort".

Rolling Stone India says, Indian music plagiarism tracking site www.itwofs.com alleges 52 instances between 2004 and 2010 where Pritam's songs are said to be "lifted", "copied", "plagiarized", or "similar" to those of tunes by other composers, who range from Arab and East Asian artists (such as Ihab Tawfik, Yuri Mrakadi and Kim Hyung-sub) to Western musicians like Boney M. and Damien Rice.

In an interview with Hindustan Times Pritam commented on the allegations of plagiarism in his music, "Yes, I did make mistakes initially. But once I realised it, I have been particular about my music. However, people keep making false allegations, because it’s easy to do that. Since the last three years, I have stopped taking false allegations seriously. For example, the Iranian band that said I had plagiarised ‘Pungi’ (Agent Vinod; 2012) had to give an apology in court for using my name falsely.".

On screen appearance

Music videos and films
 Gangster (Music video for the song "Bheegi Bheegi")
 Life in A... Metro (Guest appearance)
 Jab Harry Met Sejal (Promotional Music video for the song "Safar")
 "Biba" Marshmello x Pritam, Shirley Setia (Music Video)

Television
Pritam mentored and judged Sa Re Ga Ma Pa Challenge 2009 and was a judge for Chhote Ustaad on Zee TV. He was also a guest judge for the X factor and Zee Bangla's Sa Re Ga Ma Pa 2012–13. He also composed the title track for Hrithik Roshan’s TV series Just Dance for Star TV which was sung by KK. Pritam sang some of his top hits on the popular show MTV Unplugged (Season 5) on 13 February 2016. Pritam is the mentor and judge of Sa Re Ga Ma Pa 2016 alongside Mika Singh and Sajid–Wajid. He was also a part of Star plus’ show Dil Hai Hindustani as a judge alongside Sunidhi Chauhan and Badshah in 2018.

Awards and nominations

Discography

References

External links
 

Living people
Indian male playback singers
Bengali musicians
Film and Television Institute of India alumni
Filmfare Awards winners
Indian film score composers
Singers from West Bengal
1971 births
Bollywood playback singers
Zee Cine Awards winners
Indian male film score composers
21st-century Indian male singers
21st-century Indian singers